The British Sports Car Championship, was a British domestic motor racing championship which was originally created for sports cars complying with Appendix C of the International Sporting Code. For 1966 the championship was for Group 7 Sports Racing Cars and for 1967 it was restricted to Group 4 Sports Cars. By 1970, the 2-litre sports category had become very popular across Europe, therefore the organisers decided to change the championship regulations, admitting only these cars. The championship was abandoned during the 1972 season, after one race, because of a lack of entries. An attempt to re-launch the championship lead to a one-off single season being run in 1976.

The series began in 1964 with the Lavant Cup at Goodwood being won by John Coundley, however by the end of the inaugural season, established Formula One drivers were taking part, with the reigning World Drivers Champion, Jim Clark and Bruce McLaren among the race winners.

Championship winners

References

 
Sports car racing series